Pseudomyagrus waterhousei is a species of beetle in the family Cerambycidae, and the only species in the genus Pseudomyagrus. It was described by Gahan in 1888.

References

Lamiini
Beetles described in 1888